19521 Chaos is a cubewano, a Kuiper-belt object not in resonance with any planet. Chaos was discovered in 1998 by the Deep Ecliptic Survey with Kitt Peak's 4 m telescope.

On 20 November 2020, Chaos occulted a magnitude 16.8 star. Another occultation was recorded on 14 January 2022; full results on size, shape, geometric albedo, and the spin-axis orientation have not been released.

Name
It is named after the primeval state of existence in Greek mythology, from which the first gods appeared.

Planetary symbols are no longer much used in astronomy, so Chaos never received a symbol in the astronomical literature. There is no standard symbol for Chaos used by astrologers either. Michael Moorcock's Symbol of Chaos has been used.

Orbit 

19521 Chaos has an orbital period of approximately 309 years. Its orbit is longer, but less eccentric than the orbit of Pluto. 19521 Chaos's orbit is inclined approximately 12° to the ecliptic. Its orbit never crosses the orbit of Neptune.

Chaos is at perihelion around December 2033, coming as close as 40 AUs from Earth. Its brightest magnitude will be 20.8.

Physical characteristics

Chaos is a dark object, with an albedo estimated at 5%, implying a diameter of 600 km. It rotates slowly in 3.985 days.

References

External links 
 
 
 
 

Classical Kuiper belt objects
Discoveries by the Deep Ecliptic Survey
Chaos
Possible dwarf planets
19981119